The Coordination Council of Islamic Revolution Forces is an umbrella organization of conservative political organizations and figures in Iran, known for its activity during the 2000s, when it was considered "Iran's main conservative alliance".

The organization issued a list of candidates for 2004 Iranian legislative election and backed Ali Larijani in the 2005 Iranian presidential election. In 2006, Hassan Ghafourifard was head of its election headquarters.

Affiliated organizations 
 Combatant Clergy Association
 Islamic Coalition Party
 Society of Devotees of the Islamic Revolution
 Alliance of Builders of Islamic Iran

References

2000 establishments in Iran
Political party alliances in Iran
Principlist political groups in Iran
Political parties established in 2000